Ponder Independent School District is a public school district based in Ponder, Texas, United States.

In 2009, the school district was rated "academically acceptable" by the Texas Education Agency.

It includes Ponder, DISH, and portions of Denton and Northlake.

Schools
Ponder High School (Grades 9–12)
Ponder Junior High (Grades 6–8)
Ponder Elementary (Grades PK–5)

Athletics
The Ponder High School boys basketball team has captured the state championship five times, three of them consecutively.  These include the 2001, 2008, 2009, 2010, and 2014 AA Boys State Basketball Championships.
The Ponder High School girls basketball team has made two appearances in the state tournament.
Ponder High School began a football program in 2007.  The Lions played their first varsity level UIL sanctioned football game in the fall of 2010.

References

External links
Ponder ISD

School districts in Denton County, Texas
Denton, Texas